Utricularia choristotheca is a very small, probably perennial, rheophytic carnivorous plant that belongs to the genus Utricularia. U. choristotheca is endemic to Suriname, where it is only known from the type location, and French Guiana, where it is found on Montagne des Nouragues. It has been collected in flower or fruit in July. It was originally described and published by Peter Taylor in 1986.

See also 
 List of Utricularia species

References 

Carnivorous plants of South America
Flora of French Guiana
Flora of Suriname
choristotheca